Xiphophorus continens, also known as El Quince swordtail or short-sword platyfish, is a live-bearing freshwater fish in the family Poeciliidae. It is endemic to the Pánuco River basin in east-central Mexico. Its name comes from the Greek conto, meaning short, and Latin ensis, meanin "sword". due to the species' sword size in males.

Description
It is a small, slender species, with a slender caudal peduncle and with a midlateral stripe. It has a hook on its gonopodium; distal serrae; its grave spot, when present, is only visible under 10X magnification; no xanthophore or pterinophore pigment patterns.

Distribution
Headwaters of the Rio Ojo Frio, north of Damian Carmona, Pánuco River drainage, San Luis Potosí.

References

Further reading
Reproductive behaviour: ; pdf: http://www.sbs.utexas.edu/ryan/Publications/2008/2008AnimBeh75%201731.pdf

External links
ADW entry
ITIS entry

continens
Taxa named by Mary Rauchenberger
Taxa named by Klaus D. Kallman
Taxa named by Donald Charles Morizot
Fish described in 1990